The Soekarno–Hatta Airport Skytrain is a semi-driverless 3.05 kilometre Automated People Mover System (APMS) which connects Soekarno-Hatta Airport Terminals 1, 2, 3 and SHIA railway station, free of charge. Trains are spaced 5 minutes apart, with 7 minutes needed to get from Terminal 1 to Terminal 3.

Rolling stock

The system uses Airport Automated People Mover System rubber-tyred metro manufactured by state-owned enterprise PT LEN Industri in cooperation with South Korean Woojin Industries. Three train units operate with each train unit consisting of two cars. They are capable to transport 176 passengers in one trip. The train travels at a speed of 60 kilometers per hour. Each trainset is equipped with automated guide-way transit (AGT) technology. The system is capable for automated operations, but its implementation have been delayed pending trials conducted by LEN Industri.

Stations

There are 4 stations served by Airport Skytrain; Terminal 1, 2 and 3 each has one station. The airport shuttle Skytrain is integrated to SHIA railway station, from where passengers can conveniently travel to–and from–Jakarta city center by Soekarno–Hatta Airport Rail Link.

Skytrain operating schedule is accessible online and through the Indonesia Airport website and smartphone application. All Skytrain stations are equipped with platform screen doors and have information screens displaying real-time arrival time of the next train. Skytrain has been operational since 17 September 2017.

Future expansion

The Skytrain will be extended to planned new Terminal 4 and Sky Hub (commercial area) in Phase 2. Then it will be connected to Integrated Building Terminal, Terminal 1, 2 and 3.

References

External links

Airport people mover systems
People mover systems in Indonesia
2017 establishments in Indonesia
Railway lines opened in 2017
Soekarno–Hatta International Airport
Transport in Jakarta